The Tokyo Fire Department (TFD) (Japanese: 東京消防庁, Tokyo Shōbōchō) is the fire department of Tokyo Metropolis, Japan. Founded in 1948, the TFD is the largest urban fire department in the world, with a total staff of 18,408.

The TFD is responsible for firefighting, fire prevention, fire investigation, hazardous material handling, disaster response, rescue operations, and emergency medical services across all 23 wards of Tokyo and parts of Western Tokyo. It is headed by a fire chief. The TFD is part of the Tokyo Metropolitan Government and is distinguished from the Fire and Disaster Management Agency, which coordinates other municipal fire departments in Japan.

The TFD is headquartered in Ōtemachi, Chiyoda, Tokyo.

History 

Japan's first fire service was founded in 1629 during the Edo period, and was called Hikeshi (Japanese: 火消し, lit. Fire eraser). During the Meiji Period, the Hikeshi was merged into the Tokyo Metropolitan Police Department in 1881. During this period, pumps were imported and domestically produced, and modern firefighting strategies were introduced. The fire service would remain part of the police department until police reforms in 1947, when the Tokyo Fire Department was separated from the police as an independent agency. The TFD was officially formed on 7 March 1948.

Fire districts and fire stations 

Overall of stations in Tokyo Metropolis Area
Fire station divisions: 3
Fire stations: 81
Fire station branches: 207

Fire districts and fire stations
1st Fire District: Marunouchi, Nihonbashi, Akasaka, Kōjimachi, Rinko, Takanawa, Kanda, Shiba, Kyobashi, Azabu
2nd Fire District: Shinagawa, Den-en-chōfu, Oi, Kamata, Ebara, Yaguchi, Ōmori
3rd Fire District: Meguro, Shibuya, Setagaya, Tamagawa, Seijo
4th Fire District: Yotsuya, Nogata, Ushigome, Suginami, Shinjuku, Ogikubo, Nakano
5th Fire District: Koishikawa, Oji, Hongo, Akabane, Toshima, Takinogawa, Ikebukuro
6th Fire District: Ueno, Ogu, Asakusa, Senju, Nihonzutsumi, Adachi, Arakawa, Nishiarai
7th Fire District: Honjo, Honden, Koiwa, Mukojima, Kanamachi, Fukagawa, Edogawa, Joto, Kasai
8th Fire District: Tachikawa, Akishima, Higashimurayama, Kiyose, Musashino, Chōfu, Kokubunji, Nishitōkyō, Mitaka, Koganei, Komae, Fuchū, Kodaira, Kitatamaseibu
9th Fire District: Hachiōji, Fussa, Ōme, Tama, Machida, Akigawa, Hino, Okutama
10th Fire District: Itabashi, Shakujii, Shimura, Nerima, Hikarigaoka

Mobile units 

(As of April 1, 2019)

Demonstration and preparedness training 

A few times a year, the department has demonstrations and preparedness training. These are small and others might be large-scale events.

The demonstrations are mostly public awareness events for the people who live in the Tokyo area. This also shows the taxpayers where the funding of the department was spent, and the department's state of preparedness. This is also used as a recruiting tool for future firefighters. Commonly one sees a small demonstration every so often in district centers, schools, and shopping arcades. The firefighters would give rides, tours, or maybe let you touch equipment.

The biggest demonstration is Dezomeshiki. It's the New Year Tokyo Fire Department Review; and happens in January every year. They present all the resources and training that the Department currently are using. They perform a fake disaster where the firefighters use their equipment. They also set up a showroom for equipment and a small museum. About 2,800 people participated in Dezomeshiki in 2018.

Every so often a fire district performs a preparedness training. They train with a fake disaster in a real district area. This training is for the firefighters, support staff, and local volunteers. The training means they can better know an area if a disaster happens.

The preparedness training also uses Mass Casualties Tags. These tags are used in major disasters. These tags give information about the person and sort out many who could be saved with the current status of medical service, a form of triage.

Technologies 

The TFD currently has 12 different types of fire fighting and rescue robots. These robots are designed to handle disasters that are too dangerous for personnel during an emergency. Some types of robots can shoot water or foam on to fires. One type can rescue a person and another type are able to move large objects. Currently all robots are controlled by remote operators.

Future firefighting robotics might have simple artificial intelligence to search for life and be able to move on terrain without operator's assistance.

Ranking system and uniforms 
Rank insignias are on a small badge, pinned above the right pocket. Rank is denoted by stripes and Hexagram stars. The design of the insignias came from older Japanese-style military insignias. Some rank badges are different colors such as the fire jacket for a station commander.

The dress uniforms are a blue suit and normal firemen wear jumpsuits in the same color with orange reflection stripes. A normal fireman's fire jacket are brown with orange stripes.
Gray and white are reserved for emergency medical services with their work uniform. They are mostly seen with a light blue raincoat over them on a call.
Orange is reserved for rescuer where they wear a jump suit with the same color. The fire jacket is orange with yellow reflection stripes.
Black fire jacket with yellow and silver reflection strips are for specialized firemen or officers.

Tokyo Fire Museum 

The Tokyo Fire Museum is at Yotsuya 3–10, Shinjuku-ku. It has a large collection of historic fire fighting apparatuses. The museum has fire fighting history of the 17th and 18th centuries with large, scale-model dioramas showing scenes of destruction from past events. Models shows the uniforms and equipment that was used during that time. Other parts of the museum shows old pictures and films. They have scenes to show the birth of modern fire fighting vehicles, equipment, and fire suits. The museum has some of the very first pumps and hoses that were used. Twentieth-century firefighting history is also shown and the future of firefighting is exhibit at the museum, such as high-tech robots. A current working fire station is right next to the museum.

In popular media 
 Firefighter! Daigo of Fire Company M the Manga and its Live Action TV series Fire Boys (Megumi no Daigo) was based within the Tokyo Fire Department. Most of the cast act as Fire Department personnel.
 252: Seizonsha Ari a Disaster film; has Tokyo Fire Department personnel as main characters in the film. They are rescuing people during the aftermath.
 Tokyo Magnitude 8.0 The Animation shows the Tokyo Fire Department saving the city from the aftermath of a major earthquake that hits central Tokyo.
Fire Force En'en no Shōbōtai features firefighters as the story's focus in a fictional post-apocalyptic Tokyo. The organization in Fire Force is instead dubbed the titular "Special Fire Force". However, rather than simply partaking in real-world firefighting, firefighters in the series primarily battle "Infernals", fictional fire-based monsters, in live combat.

See also 

 List of fire departments

References

External links 

Tokyo Fire Department
Tokyo Fire Department 
Tokyo Fire Museum 
Tokyo Fire Museum – Learn about Tokyo’s Past through its History of Fighting Fire

Government of Tokyo
Fire departments
Articles containing video clips